Thiramala is a 1953 Malayalam-language film, directed by Vimal Kumar and P. R. S. Pillai, starring Sathyan, Kumari Thankam, Thomas Burleigh, Ponathil Sivadas, Prabha . The film has a significant place in the history of Malayalam cinema. Filmmaker Ramu Kariat worked as an assistant director in this film. Hindustani vocalist Lakshmi Shankar recorded a song for this film.

The film was screened in various territories of the Kerala state with a different climax, a highly unique way in those days.

Plot
The film was based on a short story Sholey, written by T. N. Gopinathan Nair, who also wrote the script and also acted in a major role in the film.

Lakshmi (Kumari Thankam), daughter of the village landlord Kurup (T. N. Gopinathan Nair) and Venu (Thomas Berleigh), son of the ferryman Panikkar (P. Bhaskaran) are childhood sweethearts. Their love blooms much against the wishes of father Kurup. Kurup was successful in getting Lakshmi to marry Vijayan (Sathyan). Venu leaves his village and finds a waiter's job in a city hotel.

Vijayan leads an immoral life making Lakshmi's life hell. Vijayan and Lakshmi come to stay in the same hotel where Venu works. Venu had to remain a silent witness to the breakup of the marriage of Vijyan and Lakshmi.

Vijayan falls into the charm of a hotel dancer Swapna Latha. He eventually loses all his wealth. A repentant Vijayan leaves the city in search of Lakshmi. Venu, who had also returned to the village, meets Lakshmi in a trying circumstance. Waiting to be taken across the swollen river during a raging storm, Lakshmi is helped by Venu. Just when he sees Lakshmi safely to the other shore, Venu is thrown into the river and is drowned.

The film was screened in various territories of the Kerala state with a different climax, a highly unique way in those days. In the Malabar region, the film had a happy ending with Lakshmi saved from the storm by Venu, who entrusts her to Vijayan. In the Southern region of the state, the film ends with a frame showing the dead body of Venu, which is washed ashore.

Cast
 Sathyan
 Kumari Thankam
 Thomas Burleigh
 Miss Chandani
 Kumari Kalyani
 P. Bhaskaran
Sasikumar
T. N. Gopinathan Nair
Chandni (Old)
 T. N. K. J. Thomas
 T. S. Muthaiah
 Kumari Prabha (child artiste)
 Adoor Bhasi
 Baby Valsala
 Ponathil Sivadas

References

External links
 

1953 films
1950s Malayalam-language films
Indian black-and-white films
Films directed by Vimal Kumar